Anikkad  is a village in Ernakulam district in the state of Kerala, India. It is located near the Muvattupuzha town in Avoly Panchayat.

Location
Anicadu is situated in Muvattupuzha taluk of Kerala State, in Main Eastern Highway in between Muvattupuzha - Vazhakulam 4KM from Muvattupuzha, 4KM to Vazhakulam and 12KM to Thodupuzha. The economy of Anicadu is reliant on agriculture, and the main cultivations are rubber and pineapple.

Nearby towns 
The nearby main towns are Muvattupuzha, Thodupuzha, Kothamangalam,  Koothattukulam. There are many small suburban towns close to Anicadu like Vazhakulam, Kalloorkkad, Pothanicad etc.

Transportation 
KL-17 is the RTO code for Muvattupuzha, including Anicadu Village. Muvattupuzha KSRTC depot is located on MC Road towards south of the Muvattupuzha town just  from Anicadu.

  SH 8, Main Eastern Highway (Muvattupuzha -  Punalur) is passing through Anicadu.
 4KM away from SH 1 - MC Road
 6KM away from NH 85 (previously NH 49) Kochi-Dhanushkodi passing through Munnar.

Demographics
 India census, Anikkad had a population of 2,245 with 1,081 males and 1,164 females.

Government
The place falls under Muvattupuzha assembly constituency, which is part of Idukki (Lok Sabha constituency). It was part of Muvattupuzha (Lok Sabha constituency) until 2004.

References

Villages in Ernakulam district